Archasia is a genus of treehoppers in the family Membracidae.

Species
These 3 species belang tae the genus Archasia:
 Archasia auriculata
 Archasia belfragei
 Archasia pallida

References

Smiliinae
Auchenorrhyncha genera